The Vijay Hazare Trophy, (officially known as Mastercard Vijay Hazare trophy for sponsorship reasons) also known as the Ranji One-Day Trophy, is an annual limited-overs cricket domestic competition involving state teams from the Ranji Trophy plates organised by the Board of Control for Cricket in India (BCCI). The tournament was started in the 2002-03 season and is named after the legendary twentieth-century Indian cricketer Vijay Hazare.

Tamil Nadu is the most successful team having won the trophy five times. Saurashtra cricket team are the current champions, defeating Maharashtra in the (2022-23 Vijay Hazare Trophy) to win their second title.

In January 2021, the Board of Control for Cricket in India (BCCI) announced that the tournament would take place despite the 2020–21 Ranji Trophy being cancelled due to the COVID-19 pandemic in India.

Format

Until the 2014–15 season, 28 teams are split into 5 zonal groups as follows:

After playing each team in the group once, the five winners and the best performing runner-up qualify for the quarter final stage directly, while the four other runners-up play in the preliminary quarter finals. The two winners of pre-quarter finals join the remaining six teams in the quarter final stage. From the 2015–16 to 2017–18 season, the zonal groups were replaced with 4 groups of 7 each.

From 2018 to 2019 season, the teams were divided into 3 elite groups and 1 plate group. The 2 top elite group had 9 teams while 3rd elite group has 10 team. Plate group consists of 9 new teams. Teams are grouped based on average points in preceding 3 seasons.

Tournament history 
From the tournament's inaugural edition during the 1993–94 season through to the 2001–02 season, no finals were held, and teams consequently played only within their zones, with no overall winner named.

During the 2002–03 and 2003–04 seasons, a final round-robin stage was held for the top teams in each zone. Since the 2004–05 tournament, a playoff format including semi-finals and a final has been held, with varying formats.

References

External links

Indian domestic cricket competitions
List A cricket competitions
 Cricket in India